Manta is a South Korean digital comics (or webtoons, webcomics, manhwa) platform owned and operated by RIDI Corporation.  It works with its own in-house studio as well as outside partners to create original digital comics.

Service 

Manta is a subscription-based service that allows all members to read unlimited amounts of content on its app at a fixed price. The app is available for Android and iOS devices, and all content can be viewed from its official website.

Manta is known to be the first subscription-based webcomic platform in the market. 

Many of Manta's webcomics share the IP with those in Ridibooks, which is Ridi Corporation's domestic (Korean) business. Main titles of Ridibooks such as 'Under the Oak Tree (상수리 나무 아래)', 'Lady Devil (마귀)' are also well known globally through Manta.

The platform now serves both English and Spanish.

History 
Manta was founded by Kisik Bae, Founder and CEO of RIDI Corporation, in November 2020.

It was a latecomer in the webcomic industry, but rather than pay-per-episode, Manta was one of the few subscription-based webcomics services available.

4 months after its launch in March 2021, Manta ranked No.1 in US Google play store's cartoon category.

Content 
Manta focuses mainly on bringing original stories from RIDI, a Korean digital content platform also owned by RIDI Corporation, into webcomics.

Most of Manta’s titles are in the romance genre, with titles including Under the Oak Tree a romance fantasy webcomic based on a web novel by Kim Suji., Disobey the Duke if you Dare, and Semantic Error, the latter having also been adapted into a live action streaming television series. It also offers stories in other genres including action, thriller, and horror.

The platform also works with third-party IP rights holders to extend existing films and live-action storytelling into webcomics, such as Svaha: the Sixth Finger and A Hard Day.

Userbase 
In an Interview, Kisik Bae said the app has reached five million downloads as of April 2022. The number has gone up to eight million in October 2022.

See also 

 Webtoon
 Webtoon (platform)

References

External links 
 Official manta website

Webtoon publishing companies
Manhwa distributors
Webcomic publishing companies
2020 establishments in South Korea
Internet properties established in 2020